Errol railway station served the village of Errol, Perth and Kinross, Scotland from 1847 to 1985 on the Dundee and Perth Railway.

History 
The station opened on 24 May 1847 by the Dundee and Perth Railway. The goods yard was to the north and it consisted of four sidings. The signal box, which was built in 1890, was to the west. The station closed to both passengers and goods traffic on 30 September 1985. The signal box still survives.

References

External links 

Disused railway stations in Perth and Kinross
Former Caledonian Railway stations
Railway stations in Great Britain opened in 1847
Railway stations in Great Britain closed in 1985
1847 establishments in Scotland
1985 disestablishments in Scotland